The 2017–18 Irish Cup (known as the Tennent's Irish Cup for sponsorship purposes) was the 138th edition of the premier knock-out cup competition in Northern Irish football since its introduction in 1881. The competition began on 19 August 2017 and concluded with the final at Windsor Park in May 2018.

Linfield are the defending champions, having defeated Coleraine 3–0 in the 2017 final.

A new system for penalty shoot-outs will be trialled as sanctioned by the International Football Association Board to test a different sequence of taking penalties. Known as "ABBA", it mirrors the serving sequence in a tennis tie-break i.e. team A takes the first penalty, team B takes the second penalty, team B takes the third penalty, etc.

Format and schedule
All ties level after 90 minutes used extra time to determine the winner, with a penalty shoot-out to follow if necessary.

130 clubs entered this season's competition, an increase of four clubs compared with the 2016–17 total of 126 clubs. 94 regional league clubs from tiers 4–7 in the Northern Ireland football league system entered the competition in the first round, 12 of whom received a bye into the Round 2A. (Strabane Athletic were originally excluded, but were reinstated after the first-round draw had been made, necessitating a further draw for 'Round 2A' between Strabane and the eleven clubs that had received a first-round bye, with one tie drawn and ten further byes.). The 41 first-round winners were joined by winner and the ten byes from Round 2A and the 12 clubs of the NIFL Premier Intermediate League in the second round. After two further rounds, with the eight surviving clubs joining the 24 senior NIFL Premiership and NIFL Championship clubs in the fifth round. All ties level after 90 minutes used extra time to determine the winner, with a penalty shoot-out to follow if necessary.

Results

First round
Matches were played on 19 August 2017

1st Bangor Old Boys 2–3 Tullyvallen
18th Newtownabbey Old Boys 3–2 Comber Recreation
Abbey Villa 0–3 Immaculata
Ardstraw 10–2 Richhill
Ballymacash Rangers 3–4 Shankill United
Ballynahinch United v Rosario YC (Rosario YC received bye)
Bangor Amateurs 0–3 Newtowne
Barn United 3–8 Rathfriland Rangers
Bloomfield 1–3 Craigavon City
Bryansburn Rangers 3–1 St. Mary's Youth
Coagh United 6–1 Ballymoney United
Crewe United 2–3 Drumaness Mills
Crumlin Star 9–1 Shorts
Crumlin United 3–2 Silverwood
Derriaghy Cricket Club 3–1 Bourneview Young Men
Dollingstown 1–3 Maiden City
Dunloy 3–1 Banbridge Rangers
Dunmurry Rec. 4–0  Dromore Amateurs
Fivemiletown United 1–4 Islandmagee
Glebe Rangers 2–0 Bangor
Hanover 8–2 Chimney Corner
Killyleagh YC 5–1 Newbuildings United
Laurelvale 6–1 Broomhedge Maghaberry
Lower Maze 1–2 St. Patrick's Young Men
Lurgan Town 3–1 Groomsport
Magherafelt Sky Blues v Colin Valley (Colin Valley received bye)
Malachians v Downshire Young Men (Downshire Young Men received bye)
Markethill Swifts 2–1 Grove United
Moneyslane 1–4 Sirocco Works
Orangefield Old Boys 3–0 Dunmurry Young Men
Oxford United Stars 4–3 Trojans
Portaferry Rovers 3–1  Ballynahinch Olympic
Rathfern Rangers 4–5 Lisburn Rangers
Rosemount Rec 3–1 St. Luke's
Royal British Legion 1–2 Dromara Village
Saintfield United 2–4 Tandragee Rovers
Seagoe 1–12 Larne Tech Old Boys
Seapatrick 1–4 Ballynure Old Boys
Suffolk 2–3 Dungiven Celtic
Valley Rangers 5–0 Oxford Sunnyside
Windmill Stars 2–1 St. James' Swifts

Round 2A
Strabane Athletic were originally excluded from the competition, but were reinstated after the first-round draw had been made, necessitating a 'Round 2A' involving Strabane and the eleven clubs that had received first-round byes. One tie drawn was drawn and the following ten teams received further byes: Albert Foundry, Ballywalter Rec., Brantwood, Cookstown Youth, Desertmartin, Mossley, Newcastle, Strabane Athletic, UUJ and Wellington Rec.

Match played on 23 September 2017
Ards Rangers 9–0 Iveagh United

Second round
The twelve members of the NIFL Premier Intermediate League join the competition at this stage as well as the first-round winners, and the winners and byes from Round 2A.

Matches were played on 30 September 2017

18th Newtownabbey Old Boys 1–2 UUJ
Annagh United 4–2 Markethill Swifts
Ardstraw 2–6 Dundela
Armagh City 2–0 Coagh United
Ballywalter Recreation 6–3 Ballynure Old Boys
Bryansburn Rangers 3–4 Albert Foundry
Colin Valley 1–4 Valley Rangers
Cookstown Youth 6–7 Craigavon City
Crumlin Star 5–0 Oxford United Stars
Crumlin United 2–0 Donegal Celtic
Derriaghy Cricket Club 1–2 Shankill United
Downshire Young Men 1–10 Moyola Park
Dromara Village 0–1 Banbridge Town
Drumaness Mills 0–2 Hanover
Dunloy 1–2 Portstewart
Dunmurry Rec. 0–7 Tobermore United
Glebe Rangers 3–0 Rosemount Recreation
Immaculata 2–1 Larne Tech Old Boys
Islandmagee 1–2 Ards Rangers
Killyleagh YC 2–0 Sirocco Works
Laurelvale 5–2 Tullyvallen
Maiden City 7–1 Lurgan Town
Newcastle 3–1 Strabane Athletic
Newington 0–3 Lisburn Distillery
Newtowne 4–2 Desertmartin
Portaferry Rovers 2–0 Mossley
Queen's University 7–2 Dungiven Celtic
Rathfriland Rangers 4–1 Orangefield Old Boys
Rosario YC 4–0 Brantwood
Sport & Leisure Swifts 2–0 Windmill Stars
St Patrick's YM 3–2 Wellington Recreation
Tandragee Rovers 3–2 Lisburn Rangers

Third round
Matches were played on 4 November 2017

Armagh City 1–2 Crumlin Star
Ballywalter Recreation 3–2 Ards Rangers
Banbridge Town 1–2 Queen's University
Craigavon City 1–4 Albert Foundry
Crumlin United 2–0 Valley Rangers
Glebe Rangers v UUJ (Glebe Rangers received a bye)
Hanover 2–3 Shankill United
Immaculata 3–1 Brantwood (aet) 
Killyleagh YC 3–1 Tobermore United
Laurelvale 0–5 Moyola Park
Newcastle 3–0 Rathfriland Rangers
Newtowne 0–2 Lisburn Distillery
Portstewart 2–1 Portaferry Rovers
Sport & Leisure Swifts 0–2 Dundela
St Patrick's Young Men 2–5 Annagh United
Tandragee Rovers 1–2 Maiden City (aet)

Fourth round
Matches were played on 2 December 2017

Crumlin United 2–4 Immaculata
Dundela 5–0 Newcastle
Glebe Rangers 2–1 Annagh United
Lisburn Distillery 3–1 Albert Foundry
Moyola Park 2–0 Ballywalter Recreation
Portstewart 1–1 Maiden City (Maiden City won 3–1 on pens)
Queen's University 3–1 Killyleagh YC
Shankill United 0–4 Crumlin Star

Fifth round
Matches were played on 6 January 2018

|}

Sixth round
Matches were played on 3 February 2018

|}

Quarter-finals
Matches were due to be played on 3 March 2018 but only the Glenavon/Loughgall fixture was completed on this date. The three remaining fixtures were played on 13 March 2018.

|}

Semi-finals
Matches were played on 31 March 2018. Cliftonville played Loughgall at the Oval, and Coleraine played Larne at Ballymena Showgrounds.

|}

Final
The final was played on 5 May 2018 at the National Football Stadium at Windsor Park.

References

External links
 Official site
 nifootball.co.uk

2017–18
Cup
2017–18 European domestic association football cups